In enzymology, a 2,5-dioxovalerate dehydrogenase is an enzyme that catalyzes the chemical reaction

2,5-dioxopentanoate + NADP+ + H2O  2-oxoglutarate + NADPH + 2 H+

The 3 substrates of this enzyme are 2,5-dioxopentanoate, NADP+, and H2O, whereas its 3 products are 2-oxoglutarate, NADPH, and H+.

This enzyme belongs to the family of oxidoreductases, specifically those acting on the aldehyde or oxo group of donor with NAD+ or NADP+ as acceptor.  The systematic name of this enzyme class is 2,5-dioxopentanoate:NADP+ 5-oxidoreductase. Other names in common use include 2-oxoglutarate semialdehyde dehydrogenase, and alpha-ketoglutaric semialdehyde dehydrogenase.  This enzyme participates in ascorbate and aldarate metabolism.

References 

 

EC 1.2.1
NADPH-dependent enzymes
Enzymes of unknown structure